The brown-crowned tchagra (Tchagra australis) is a species of bird in the family Malaconotidae.

Range and habitat
It is found in Angola, Benin, Botswana, Burundi, Cameroon, Central African Republic, Republic of the Congo, DRC, Eswatini, Ivory Coast, Gabon, Ghana, Guinea, Kenya, Liberia, Malawi, Mali, Mozambique, Namibia, Nigeria, Rwanda, Sierra Leone, South Africa, South Sudan, Tanzania, Togo, Uganda, Zambia, and Zimbabwe.
Its natural habitats are subtropical or tropical dry forests and dry savanna.

References

External links

 Brown-crowned Tchagra Tchagra australis - Species text in The Atlas of Southern African Birds.

brown-crowned tchagra
Birds of Sub-Saharan Africa
brown-crowned tchagra
Taxonomy articles created by Polbot